The Leeward Islands Cricket Association, also known as the Leeward Islands Cricket Board (more often since 2015), is the ruling body for cricket in the following Caribbean islands: Anguilla, Antigua and Barbuda (founding member in 1913), the British Virgin Islands, Montserrat (founding member in 1913), Nevis (admitted in 1949), Saint Kitts (founding member in 1913), Sint Maarten, and the United States Virgin Islands. Dominica is geopgraphically a part of the Leeward Islands, but as it was part of the Windward Islands colony from 1940 until its independence, its cricket federation remains a part of the Windward Islands although it did participate in the first Leeward Islands tournament and was a founding member of the Leeward Islands Cricket Association in 1913.

Member associations 
 Anguilla Cricket Association
 Antigua and Barbuda Cricket Association
 British Virgin Islands Cricket Association
 Montserrat Cricket Association
 Nevis Cricket Association (for the island of Nevis alone)
 Saint Kitts Cricket Association (for the island of Saint Kitts alone)
 Sint Maarten Cricket Association (for the Dutch part of Saint Martin Island)
 United States Virgin Islands Cricket Association

Associated member associations 
 Guadeloupe (overseas region of the French Republic)
 Saba (special municipality of the Netherlands)
 Saint Barthélemy (overseas collectivity of France)
 Saint Martin (for the French part of Saint Martin Island)
 Sint Eustatius (special municipality of the Netherlands)

See also
 Cricket West Indies
 Leeward Islands cricket team
 Windward Islands Cricket Board of Control

References 

Cricket in Antigua and Barbuda
Cricket in Anguilla
Cricket in Saint Kitts and Nevis
Cricket in Montserrat
Cricket in Sint Maarten
Cricket in the Leeward Islands
Cricket in the United States Virgin Islands
Cricket in the British Virgin Islands
Sports governing bodies in Saint Kitts and Nevis
Cricket administration in the West Indies
1913 establishments in North America
Sports organizations established in 1913